Hølaas is a Norwegian surname. Notable people with the surname include:

Andreas Hølaas (1832–1907), Norwegian civil servant, auditor, and politician
Odd Hølaas (1898–1968), Norwegian journalist and writer

Norwegian-language surnames
Surnames of Norwegian origin